The Montreal Biodome is a facility located at Olympic Park in the Mercier–Hochelaga-Maisonneuve neighbourhood of Montreal, Quebec, Canada, that allows visitors to walk through replicas of four ecosystems found in the Americas. The building was originally constructed for the 1976 Olympic Games as a velodrome with 2,600 seats. It hosted both track cycling and judo events. Renovations on the building began in 1989 and in 1992 the indoor nature exhibit was opened.

The Montreal Biodome is one of four facilities that make part of the largest natural science museum complex in Canada, Space for Life, which also includes the Montreal Insectarium, Montreal Botanical Garden, and Rio Tinto Alcan Planetarium. It is an accredited member of both the Association of Zoos and Aquariums (AZA) and the Canada's Accredited Zoos and Aquariums association (CAZA).

History
The building was designed by French architect Roger Taillibert as part of his larger plan for an Olympic park that included the Montreal Olympic Stadium and the Olympic pool. The venue was a combined velodrome and judo facility. Construction of the building began in August 1973, and the facility was officially opened in April 1976.

The velodrome, along with the accompanying Olympic pool, inspired Tallibert's later designs for Luxembourg's National Sports and Culture Centre.

In 1988, a feasibility study was conducted for converting the velodrome into a biodome. Construction started in 1989, and the facility was opened to the public on 18 June 1992 as the Montreal Biodome.

In the summer of 2003, the Biodome installed an audio guide system that lets visitors get information about what they are viewing, and also provides statistics to the facility about what the visitors find most interesting. Visitors can rent a receiver programmed to receive French, Spanish, or English for adults, or French or English for children.

Exhibits
The facility allows visitors to walk through replicas of four ecosystems found in the Americas:

 The Tropical Forest is a replica of the South American rainforest.
 The Laurentian Forest is a replica of the North American wilderness.
 The Saint Lawrence Marine Eco-system is an estuary habitat modelled on the Gulf of Saint Lawrence.
The Sub-Polar Region is a habitat that is divided into Arctic and Antarctic.

All the exhibits are housed inside the former velodrome (cycling stadium) that was used for the cycling and judo events of the 1976 Summer Olympics, with each of the four environments taking up a portion of the stadium.  A variety of animals live in each simulated habitat, ranging from the macaws in the Tropical Forest, to the lynx in the Laurentian Forest, to the penguins in the Antarctic and the different kinds of fish that inhabit the waters of the Saint Lawrence River. As well, two new species have been discovered living in the Biodome: the acarian Copidognathus biodomus in the simulated estuary in 1996, and the bacterium Nitratireductor aquibiodomus in the water reprocessing system in 2003.

Renovation
In October 2015, it was announced that both the Biodome and the Insectarium would be closing their doors to the public from September 2016 to December 2017, in order to be renovated, as part of the city of Montreal's 375th anniversary; however, in August 2016, the mayor of Montreal cancelled the contract to renovate the Biodome, because the bid results received by the city were much higher than the initial estimates. The facelift project went back to a bidding process. The Biodome closed for renovations on April 2, 2018. The reopening was pushed back from September 2019 to December 2019, and then to the spring of 2020 due to a shortage of supplies and specialized labourers. The COVID-19 pandemic caused additional delays, and the Biodome finally reopened to the public on August 31, 2020. A mobile app was also released, offering augmented reality features and more in-depth information about the different plants and animals.

Gallery

See also
Bio-Dome, the film
Biosphere 2, the attempt to create a self-contained ecological system
Olympic Stadium (Montreal)

References

External links

 
Space for Life Foundation home page 
The Glass Ark, a National Film Board of Canada documentary

Biodome
Zoos in Quebec
Aquaria in Canada
Covered stadiums
Buildings and structures completed in 1976
Zoos established in 1992
Tourist attractions in Montreal
Venues of the 1976 Summer Olympics
Indoor zoos
Event venues established in 1976
Sports venues completed in 1976
Defunct sports venues in Canada
Olympic cycling venues
Olympic judo venues
Mercier–Hochelaga-Maisonneuve
1976 establishments in Quebec
1992 establishments in Quebec